The Iribarren Municipality is one of the nine municipalities (municipios) that make up the Venezuelan state of Lara and, according to a 2007 population estimate by the National Institute of Statistics of Venezuela, the municipality has a population of 1,027,022.  The City of Barquisimeto is the shire town of the Iribarren Municipality.

Demographics
The Iribarren Municipality, according to a 2011 population census by the National Institute of Statistics of Venezuela, has a population of 996.230 (up from 915,634 in 2000). This amounts to 56% of the state's population.

Government
The mayor of the Iribarren Municipality is Alfredo Ramos, elected on December 8, 2013. The municipality is divided into 10 parishes; Catedral, Concepción, El Cují, Juan de Villegas, Santa Rosa, Tamaca, Unión, Aguedo Felipe Alvarado, Buena Vista, and Juárez.

References

External links
iribarren-lara.gob.ve 
Nuevo Sistema Ferroviario de Venezuela 
Video of Barquisimeto and its surroundings 

Municipalities of Lara (state)